Øieren may refer to:

An archaic name of the lake Øyeren
The name of the newspaper Østlandets Blad from 1908 to 1918